Isaiah 46 is the forty-sixth chapter of the Book of Isaiah in the Hebrew Bible or the Old Testament of the Christian Bible. This book contains the prophecies attributed to the prophet Isaiah, and is a part of the Books of the Prophets. Isaiah 40-55 is known as "Deutero-Isaiah" and dates from the time of the Israelites' exile in Babylon.

Text 
The original text was written in Hebrew language. This chapter is divided into 13 verses.

Textual witnesses
Some early manuscripts containing the text of this chapter in Hebrew are of the Masoretic Text tradition, which includes the Codex Cairensis (895), the Petersburg Codex of the Prophets (916), Aleppo Codex (10th century), Codex Leningradensis (1008).

Fragments containing parts of this chapter were found among the Dead Sea Scrolls (3rd century BC or later):
 1QIsaa: complete
 1QIsab: extant: verses 3‑13
 4QIsab (4Q56): extant: verses 1-3
 4QIsad (4Q58): extant: verses 10‑13

There is also a translation into Koine Greek known as the Septuagint, made in the last few centuries BCE. Extant ancient manuscripts of the Septuagint version include Codex Vaticanus (B; B; 4th century), Codex Sinaiticus (S; BHK: S; 4th century), Codex Alexandrinus (A; A; 5th century) and Codex Marchalianus (Q; Q; 6th century).

Parashot
The parashah sections listed here are based on the Aleppo Codex. Isaiah 46 is a part of the Consolations (Isaiah 40–66). {P}: open parashah; {S}: closed parashah.
 [{P} 45:18-25] 46:1-2 {P} 46:3-4 {S} 46:5-7 {S} 46:8-11 {S} 46:12-13 {S}

Structure
The Jerusalem Bible organises this chapter as follows:
Isaiah 46:1-4 = The fall of Bel
Isaiah 46:5-7 = Yahweh is without equal
Isaiah 46:8-13 = Yahweh is lord of the future 
There are no subdivisions in the New King James Version, where the chapter is sub-titled "Dead Idols and the Living God", or the New International Version, where the chapter is sub-titled "Gods of Babylon".

Verse 1
 Bel boweth down, Nebo stoopeth, 
 their idols were upon the beasts, and upon the cattle: 
 your carriages were heavy loaden;
 they are a burden to the weary beast.
Bel was the sky-god of the Babylonians and the Assyrians. Nebo (or Nabu) was the Babylonian god of scribes and wisdom.

Verse 4
 Even to your old age, I am He,
 And even to gray hairs I will carry you!
 I have made, and I will bear;
 Even I will carry, and will deliver you.

Verse 4 is the inspiration for the Christian hymn: "Safe In Jehovah’s Keeping".

See also
Bel (mythology)
Marduk
Nebo (or Nabu)
Related Bible parts:  Isaiah 44, Jeremiah 50, Jeremiah 51

References

Bibliography

External links

Jewish
Isaiah 46 Original Hebrew with Parallel English

Christian
Isaiah 46 English Translation with Parallel Latin Vulgate

46